The Let's Be Crazy Tour was the second headlining tour by American country music singer Hunter Hayes and is in support of his debut self titled studio album.

Background
On May 1, 2013, Hayes announced the Let's Be Crazy Tour. Ashley Monroe, was the opening act for the tour dates.

Opening acts
Ashley Monroe
Frankie Ballard

Setlist

"Storm Warning"
"Can't Say Love"
"Faith to Fall Back On"
"Rainy Season"
"I'm Yours" 
"Somebody's Heartbreak"
"A Thing About You"
"Love Makes Me"
"Cry with You"
"All You Ever"
"In a Song" 
"Somebody Like You" 
"Everybody's Got Somebody But Me"
"On Top of the World" 
"More Than I Should"
"Where We Left Off"
"Wanted"
"Light Me Up"
"Better Than This"
Encore
"What You Gonna Do" 
"I Want Crazy"

Tour dates

Box office score data

References

2013 concert tours
Hunter Hayes concert tours